Dźwiniacz Dolny  ( Dzvyniach Dolishniy) is a village in the administrative district of Gmina Ustrzyki Dolne, within Bieszczady County, Subcarpathian Voivodeship, in south-eastern Poland. It lies approximately five kilometers (three miles) north-west of Ustrzyki Dolne and seventy-five kilometers (forty-seven miles) south-east of the regional capital Rzeszów.

The village has a population of about four hundred.

References

Villages in Bieszczady County